Pselnophorus hodgesi is a moth of the family Pterophoridae. It is found in the United States, where it has been recorded from southern Arizona and southern Texas.

The ground color of the forewings is light drab to fuscous, with scattered light buff scales. The hindwings are uniform light drab. Adults are on wing from the end of June to mid-October, probably in multiple generations per year.

Etymology
The species is named for Ronald W. Hodges, who collected long series of this species.

References

Oidaematophorini
Moths described in 2014